Beach Station may refer to:

Beach Station (Chesterfield, Virginia), a United States national historic district
Beach Monorail Station, also called Central Beach Monorail Station, in Singapore
The Beach (radio station), an FM radio station in East Norfolk and North East Suffolk, England
Beach railway station (England), a former miniature railway station in North Yorkshire, England
Beach railway station (New Zealand), a former station in Wellington, New Zealand
Beach Halt railway station, in Wales
Beach Halt railway station (Ireland), a former station in County Donegal, Ireland

Similar titles
Other stations with the word beach in their names include:

Transportation

Asia
Carmel Beach central bus station, the main bus station in Haifa, Israel
Chennai Beach railway station, in Chennai, India
Dadaepo Beach station, a metro station in Busan, South Korea
Golden Pebble Beach station, a metro station in Dalian, China
Hirokawa Beach Station in Hirogawa, Arida District, Wakayama Prefecture, Japan

Europe

United Kingdom
Beach Road railway station, a former station in Devon, Cornwall, England
Ainsdale Beach railway station, a former station in Merseyside, England
Ardrossan South Beach railway station, in North Ayrshire, Scotland
Bishopstone Beach Halt railway station, a former station in East Sussex, England
Blackpool Pleasure Beach railway station, in Blackpool, England
Cooden Beach railway station, in East Sussex, England
Cromer Beach railway station, in Norfolk, England
Felixstowe Beach railway station, a former station in Suffolk, England
Severn Beach railway station, in South Gloucestershire, England
Yarmouth Beach railway station, a former station in Norfolk, England

North America
Qualicum Beach station, a former station in British Columbia, Canada

United States
Beach 25th Street station, a rapid transit station in Queens, New York
Beach 36th Street station, a rapid transit station in Queens, New York
Beach 44th Street station, a rapid transit station in Queens, New York
Beach 60th Street station, a rapid transit station in Queens, New York
Beach 67th Street station, a rapid transit station in Queens, New York
Beach 90th Street station, a rapid transit station in Queens, New York
Beach 98th Street station, a rapid transit station in Queens, New York
Beach 105th Street station, a rapid transit station in Queens, New York
Beach Channel station, a former commuter rail station in Queens, New York
Beach and Mason station, a streetcar stop in San Francisco, California
Beach and Stockton station, a streetcar stop in San Francisco, California
Boynton Beach station, a commuter rail station in Florida
Boynton Beach Boulevard station, a proposed commuter rail station in Florida
Bradley Beach station, in New Jersey
Brighton Beach station (BMT Brighton Line), a rapid transit station in Brooklyn, New York
Chesapeake Beach railway station, a former station in Maryland
Deerfield Beach station, in Florida
Delray Beach station, in Florida
Delray Beach Seaboard Air Line Railway Station, a former depot in Florida
Downtown Long Beach station, in California
Grover Beach station, in California
Hamilton Beach station, a commuter rail station in Queens, New York
Howard Beach–JFK Airport station, a subway and people mover station in Queens, New York
Jones and Beach station a streetcar stop in San Francisco, California
Long Beach station (LIRR), a commuter rail station in New York
Long Beach Boulevard station, a rapid transit station in Los Angeles County, California
Monument Beach station, a former station in Massachusetts
Myrtle Beach Atlantic Coast Line Railroad Station, a former station in South Carolina
Old Orchard Beach station, in Maine
Point Pleasant Beach station, in New Jersey
Pompano Beach station, a commuter rail station in Florida
Rainier Beach station, a light rail station located in Seattle, Washington
Redondo Beach station, a light rail station in Los Angeles County, California
Revere Beach station, a rapid transit station in Revere, Massachusetts
Rockaway Park–Beach 116th Street station, a rapid transit station in Queens, New York
Round Lake Beach station, a commuter rail station in Illinois
Solana Beach station, in California
South Beach station, a former rapid transit station in Staten Island, New York
West Palm Beach station, in Florida
West Palm Beach station (Brightline), in Florida

Oceania

Australia
Brighton Beach railway station, in Victoria
Hallett Cove Beach railway station, in Adelaide, South Australia
Henley Beach railway station, a former station in Adelaide, South Australia
Main Beach light rail station, in Queensland
Scarborough Beach bus station, in Scarborough, Western Australia
South Beach railway station, a former station in Perth, Western Australia
Williamstown Beach railway station, in Victoria

Other uses

Asia
Cheyne Beach Whaling Station, a defunct whaling station in Australia

North America
Canada
Brighton Beach Generating Station, in Windsor, Ontario
RCAF Station Jericho Beach, originally known as Jericho Beach Air Station, in Vancouver, British Columbia
United States
Assateague Beach Coast Guard Station, a former United States Coast Guard facility in Virginia
East Beach Station, a United States Coast Guard station in Georgia
Gold Beach Ranger Station, in Rogue River-Siskiyou National Forest, Oregon
Klipsan Beach Life Saving Station, a former United States Life-Saving Service station in Washington
Manhattan Beach Air Force Station, a former United States Air Force facility in Brooklyn, New York
Naval Air Station Daytona Beach, the World War II designation of Daytona Beach International Airport, Florida
Naval Weapons Station Seal Beach, a United States Navy facility in California
Squan Beach Life-Saving Station, in New Jersey
Willow Beach Gauging Station, in Nevada

See also
Beech Forest railway station, a former station on the Crowes railway line, in Australia
Beachmont station, a rapid transit station in Boston, Massachusetts, USA
Carshalton Beeches railway station, on the Sutton & Mole Valley Lines, in England